Şifaiye Medresesi is a medrese built in 1217 in Sivas, Turkey. It bears typical Seljuk features and was built by the Rûm Seljuk Sultan Kaykaus I, who was known for his fondness for the city of Sivas where he spent the large part of his period of reign.

The complex consists of a Darüşşifa (Dâr al-Shifâ, literally "house of health", a hospital) and the medrese where medicinal studies were also taught. The complex is also alternatively called under the sultan Izeddin Keykavus I's name whose tomb is located within the compound.

Gallery

External links

Over 400 pictures of town and its sights
Sivas Medrese Info

Buildings and structures in Sivas
Buildings and structures of the Sultanate of Rum
Madrasas in Turkey
Religious buildings and structures completed in 1217